Saganaki cheese is a Greek and Turkish cheese made of sheep's milk, cow milk, goat milk, or a combination, and used to prepare saganaki. Some saganaki cheese is similar to the basket cheese made in Aegean Turkey.

It is sometimes flavored with thyme, walnut, mastic, red pepper, cinnamon, black seed, black pepper, or olive oil; or smoked.

See also
 Greek cuisine
 Turkish cuisine

References

Sheep's-milk cheeses
Goat's-milk cheeses
Turkish cheeses